You Don't Know You're Born is a British television documentary series that aired on ITV from 23 January to 6 February 2007. It features celebrities looking into their family tree.

Background
You Don't Know You're Born follows in the wake of the successful BBC programme Who Do You Think You Are?. Both shows are made by Wall to Wall. You Don't Know You're Born shows celebrities tracing their family tree and then travelling to where their ancestors lived and doing the jobs they did. It is narrated by Barbara Flynn. The show was cancelled after three episodes due to wide criticism for it being basically a clone of its BBC counterpart.

Episodes

External links

You Don't Know You're Born at Wall to Wall

2007 British television series debuts
2007 British television series endings
2000s British documentary television series
2000s British television miniseries
Television series about family history
ITV documentaries
Television series by Warner Bros. Television Studios
English-language television shows

pl:Sekrety rodzinne (program telewizyjny)